George Elder may refer to:
 George Elder (educator) (1793–1838), pioneer Roman Catholic educator
 George Elder (British Army officer) (died 1837), British Army officer who fought in the Napoleonic Wars
 George Elder (baseball) (1921–2022), American professional baseball outfielder
 George Elder Davie (1912–2007), Scottish philosopher
 SS George W. Elder  (1874–1935), a passenger/cargo ship